Born María López, María de La Candelaria (c.1698 - d.1716) was a Tzeltal Maya woman and one of the leaders of the Tzeltal Rebellion. Her father, Agustín López, was the sacristan of Cancuc in the district of Chiapas. In June 1712 María announced to the people of Tzeltal that the Virgin Mary had appeared to her with the request that a chapel be built in her honor. Prior to this announcement, the region of Chiapas had gone through two decades of social and political turmoil caused by poor harvests, repeated conflict among the Spaniards, one native rebellion, and a tribute system that was particularly burdensome on the Indians in the mountain regions. Following María's announcement Cancuc's Dominican friar attempted to punish her and her father, as well as those who believed in the miracle of the apparition. But the inhabitants of Tzeltal expelled the friar and built the chapel siding with María.

Over the following months, María López took the name María de la Candelaria.

The news of the Virgin's apparition had spread through the Mayan region drawing numerous Indians to the newly established chapel. On August 8, María de la Candelaria stood in front of the chapel and told a multitude of people that the Virgin had ordered the annihilation of the Spaniards and of other forms of Spanish authority including all kinds of tribute, the clergy, the bishop, and the mayor.

Indians from thirty two communities including Tzeltal, Tzotzil, and Ch'ol rose up in a multiethnic rebellion against the Spaniards that lasted about three and a half months. Alongside Sebastian Gomez de la Gloria -a Tzotzil Indian man from Chenalhó who claimed to have risen to Heaven-, María de la Candelaria led the rebel army and appointed Indian vicars who replaced Spanish clergy and preached the miracle of the apparition in churches of rebel towns.

On November 21 the Spaniards recaptured Cancuc and María de la Candelaria escaped with her father and other family members. Together they hid around in a series of Tzotzil towns until they found permanent refuge in the forest of Chihuisbalam between the Valley of Huitiupán and Yajalón. About three years later, in February 1716, María de la Candelaria died in childbirth. Soon after her death her family was discovered and captured by the Spaniards. During their trial María's father admitted that the miracle of the apparition had been a ploy to overthrow the Spaniards in Chiapas.

In spite of her central role in the Tzeltal Rebellion, María de la Candelaria appears to have been forgotten by the native people of Chiapas. Modern accounts of this historical event focus on Juan López, a rebel captain who was executed by the Indians.

Further reading 

Bricker, Victoria Reifler. The Indian Christ, the Indian King: The Historical Substrate of Maya Myth and Ritual. Austin, 1981. Anthropologically oriented study of rebellions in the Maya region.

Brinton, Daniel G. María Candelaria: An Historic Drama from American Aboriginal Life. Philadelphia, 1897.

Gosner, Kevin. Soldiers of the Virgin: The Moral Economy of a Colonial Maya Rebellion. Tucson, 1992. Detailed monograph on the 1712 rebellion and its economic causes. Its characterization of the period preceding the rebellion as one of economic crisis, however, is open to debate

Viqueira, Juan Pedro. Indios rebeldes e idólatras. Dos ensayos históricos sobre la rebelión India de Cancuc, Chiapas, acaecida en el año de 1712. Mexico City, 1997. Examination of the regional dynamics of the rebellion and the religious beliefs of the Indians who participated in it.

References 

1698 births
1716 deaths
Native American women in warfare
Women in 16th-century warfare
Women in war in Mexico
18th-century Mexican women